Charles Joseph Hanford (June 3, 1882 in Tunstall, England – July 19, 1963 in Trenton, New Jersey) was a center fielder in professional baseball. After a long career in minor league ball, that had begun in 1895, Hanford finally appeared in Major League games for the Buffalo Buffeds and Chicago Whales of the Federal League in 1914 and 1915.

External links

1882 births
1963 deaths
Sportspeople from Staffordshire
English baseball players
Buffalo Buffeds players
Chicago Whales players
Major League Baseball center fielders
Major League Baseball players from the United Kingdom
Major League Baseball players from England
Minor league baseball managers
Aurora (minor league baseball) players
Omaha Omahogs players
Denver (minor league baseball) players
Peoria Distillers players
Des Moines Prohibitionists players
Rock Island (minor league baseball) players
Toledo Mud Hens players
Rockford Red Sox players
Milwaukee Creams players
Anderson Orphans players
Grand Rapids Orphans players
Savannah Pathfinders players
Jersey City Skeeters players
Oshkosh Indians players
Montreal Royals players
Buffalo Bisons (minor league) players
Kansas City Blues (baseball) players
Mobile Sea Gulls players
Richmond Virginians (minor league) players
Omaha Rourkes players
People from Tunstall, Staffordshire
British emigrants to the United States